Andrew Francis Jones (born April 21, 1985) is an American high diver, acrobat, and stuntman.

Education
Jones graduated from Jordan High School in 2003.  He went on to receive a B.Sc. from the University of Utah while also a member of the University Dive Team.

College
Jones began competitive diving his senior year in high school.  He was a walk member of the University of Utah Swimming and Diving team in his freshman year, 2003–2004.  He excelled quickly and competed all four years during his collegiate education. In 2007 he was placed 3rd in the Mountain West Conference 10m Platform Championships.

Cirque du Soleil
Jones was a member of the O show of Cirque du Soleil from 2009–2014.

Red Bull Cliff Diving
Jones started diving as a wildcard with the Red Bull Cliff Diving World Series in 2011 and has dived as a member of the tour since 2014 tour.

Notable Finishes:
Azores, Portugal (2015): 3rd 
Azores, Portugal (2016): 2nd 
La Rochelle, France (2016): 2nd
Dubai, UAE (2016): 1st

USA Diving
In 2014 Jones was selected to Team USA in 2014.

FINA World Cup

27m Platform

2014: 9th

2015: 6th 

2016: 4th 

FINA World Championships

27m Platform

2015: 5th

References

1985 births
Living people
American male divers
Cirque du Soleil performers
Sportspeople from Anchorage, Alaska
University of Utah alumni
Male high divers
21st-century American people